Music of the Pacific Northwest encompasses many musical styles from prehistory to the modern Pacific Northwest.

Native American and First Nations

Song and dance were notable elements of pre-Contact Northwest culture. The abundant food supply for coastal tribes like the Tlingit, Haida, Tsimishan, Kwakiutl, Makah, Quinault and Coast Salish peoples, and other Puget Sound Salish peoples, is credited for allowing a settled lifestyle with elaborate artistic expression including woven clothing and basketry, communal longhouses and dance and music. Some dances, songs and stories were owned by a particular culture and used in association with potlatches and other important community events. Cultural preservation efforts in the 21st century include Makah and Yakama music.

Modern
In modern times, the Northwest is known for largely for its contributions to indie music, especially grunge and alternative rock. There is also a historically-strong interest in folk music and many musicians from the region have made notable contributions to the contemporary  folk revivalism movement.

Folk
Folk music from the region traditionally takes stock of Pacific Northwest in lyrical references, such as the local history, the landscape, and in the spirit of transcendentalism, which has historical roots in the exploration and settlement of the Pacific Northwest. The music is documented in Songs of the Pacific Northwest by Phil Thomas (1979), Washington Songs and Lore (written for Washington Centennial Commission in 1988) and The Rainy Day Songbook (published by Whatcom Museum of History and Art in 1978) both by Linda Allen.

Great Depression

Woody Guthrie's "Roll on Columbia", written in 1941, is the official Washington State folk song.

Jazz
Jazz artists from the Pacific Northwest include Ray Charles, Quincy Jones, Buddy Catlett, Bill Frisell, Ernestine Anderson, Larry Coryell, Jeff Lorber, Diane Schuur, Kenny G, Aaron Parks and Esperanza Spalding. The Seattle Repertory Jazz Orchestra is noted for its renditions of big band jazz music.

Heavy metal
The Pacific Northwest region – primarily Oregon, Washington, and British Columbia – has been host to a growing scene of Doom metal, Sludge metal and Stoner metal since the 1990s, influenced by the geographical origin of grunge music and a sound pioneered in part by Washington band Melvins. Common visual themes include the region's cold, rainy, forested climate, and many bands utilize psychedelic imagery influenced by bands like Sleep, Karp and Harkonen. Musical styles often share crossover features with atmospheric/ambient black metal, drone metal, and post-metal as seen in Oregon's YOB, Agalloch, Witch Mountain, Red Fang, Washington's Lesbian, Earth, Sunn O))), Vancouver's Anciients, Astrakhan, and Aaron Turner project Sumac, among various others.

Rock

1959–1960
In 1959–1960, Seattle's Dolton Records started to take off and local bands including The Kingsmen and Paul Revere and the Raiders became known as the Sea-Port Beat, later to be referred to as the Original Northwest Sound.

2000s
The indie label Sub Pop is associated with some of the most iconic Pacific Northwest acts, like Sleater-Kinney and The Postal Service. Indeed indie rock has made a stronghold in the Pacific Northwest due to prolific cities like  Portland,  Seattle, and  Olympia. KEXP is a popular and nationally-noted Seattle-based public radio station that celebrates primarily indie rock music. But the indie music scene was never contained to the genre alternative rock and many musicians from the Pacific Northwest became well-known indie folk musicians, such as Neko Case, The Decemberists and Loch Lomond. Likewise, indie pop, indietronica and indie rap music have seen PNW artists like Macklemore, Carly Rae Jepsen, and Odesza and Sir-Mix-A-Lot make notable contributions.

Pacific Northwest artists who became ground-breaking rock bands of their times include:

 Jimi Hendrix
 The Wailers
 The Sonics
 Jimmie Rodgers
 The Kingsmen
 The Ventures
 Paul Revere & the Raiders
 Merrilee Rush
 Poison Idea
 Nirvana
 Soundgarden
 Red Fang
 Nu Shooz
 Quarterflash
 The Presidents of the United States of America
 Heart
 Rickie Lee Jones
 Robert Cray
 Curtis Salgado
 Queensrÿche
 Built to Spill
 Death Cab for Cutie
 Septic Death
 Doug and the Slugs
 DOA
 Foo Fighters
 Agalloch
 Wolves in the Throne Room
 Elliott Smith
 The Decemberists
 The Dandy Warhols
 The New Pornographers
 Sleater-Kinney
 Modest Mouse
 Cherry Poppin Daddies
 Everclear
 Macklemore
 Pedro the Lion
 Sir-Mix-A-Lot
 Alice in Chains
 Subhumans
 Skinny Puppy
 Front Line Assembly
 Blitzen Trapper
 Pink Martini
 The Postal Service
 Pearl Jam
 Odesza
 MxPx
 The Microphones
 Screaming Trees

Classical music and opera
Several Northwest cities have symphony orchestras, including the Oregon Symphony, Seattle Symphony, Spokane Symphony, and Vancouver Symphony Orchestra. The Northwest Chamber Orchestra is based in Seattle. Vancouver, Seattle, and Portland have operas. Smaller cities such as Victoria and Eugene have classical groups as well.

Local music scenes

Northwest cities have spawned their own music scenes and styles, including music of Olympia, music of Portland, music of Seattle, and Northwest hiphop from Tacoma and elsewhere.

Festivals
Among the area's largest music festivals are the Merritt Mountain Music Festival, the Vancouver Folk Music Festival, the Sasquatch! Music Festival in George, Washington, Seattle's Bumbershoot and Northwest Folklife, and Portland's MusicfestNW. Portland's Waterfront Blues Festival is the largest blues-based festival west of the Mississippi River.

References

 
Pacific Northwest